Lamberta "Bep" Ipenburg-Drommel (born 21 June 1936) is a former artistic gymnast from the Netherlands. She competed at the 1960 Summer Olympics in all artistic gymnastics event with the best achievement of 14th place in the team all-around.

She won all-round national titles in 1957–1959 and finished second in 1960 and 1961. She married in 1957–1958 and changed her last name from Drommel to Ipenburg-Drommel.

References

External links
 
 
 

1936 births
Living people
Dutch female artistic gymnasts
Olympic gymnasts of the Netherlands
Gymnasts at the 1960 Summer Olympics
People from Zandvoort
Sportspeople from North Holland
20th-century Dutch women
21st-century Dutch women